Rubén Pacheco Lutz is a Costa Rican businessman and former politician. Pacheco was the minister of tourism from 2002–2006. In that position, Pacheco has emphazied "the country’s developed assets and stress the jungle less". Since leaving the government, Pacheco founded Enjoy Group Hotels & Resorts.

References
 Costa Rica will alter strategy for tourism ads A.M. Costa Rica, 18 July 2002
 Hilton Hotels Corporation Signs First Hilton(R) and Doubletree(R) Management Agreements in Costa Rica Hilton Hotels Corporation, 10 January 2007

Year of birth missing (living people)
Living people
Costa Rican businesspeople
Government ministers of Costa Rica